Malcolm Ernest Uphill (15 April 1935 – 15 August  1999) was a Welsh professional motorcycle racer. He competed in British national-level short-circuit and in Grand Prix motorcycle racing. Uphill was the first competitor in the Isle of Man Tourist Trophy races to achieve a 100 mph average lap speed on a production motorcycle.



Motorcycle racing career
A native of Caerphilly, Wales, Uphill later lived at Heol, Trecastle and was educated at Twyn Secondary Modern School. Apprenticed at the Rhymney former railway works near Caerphilly, he worked as a fitter/turner/erector for British Rail. In 1965, Uphill achieved a double win in the 350 cc 'Junior' and 500 cc 'Senior' races at the Manx Grand Prix. His best season in world championship competition was in 1968 when he finished in ninth place in the 250cc world championship. 

In 1969, he teamed with Percy Tait to win the Thruxton 500 endurance race for production (road-based) machines and at the 1969 Isle of Man TT, Uphill won the 750 Production class on a Triumph Bonneville with a 100 mph lap, which prompted renaming of the Dunlop K81 motorcycle tyre as the TT100. He also won the 750 Production class at the 1970 North West 200 held in Northern Ireland followed by the 1970 TT 750 production class on a Triumph Trident.

Uphill died aged 64 in 1999 of asbestosis. In 2011 a pub named The Malcolm Uphill was opened by Wetherspoons in Caerphilly town centre, and in 2013, following local fundraising, a bronze plaque dedicated to Uphill's memory was installed on a wall close to the pub location at Station Terrace.

References

External links
 Short videos with commentary, Uphill and Tait production race and Triumph Bonneville 1969 TT races (text content from Wikipedia)
 Malcolm Uphill at Gus Kuhn
 Uphill 100mph TT lap

1935 births
1999 deaths
Sportspeople from Caerphilly
Welsh motorcycle racers
250cc World Championship riders
350cc World Championship riders
500cc World Championship riders
Isle of Man TT riders